The Hattiesburg Zoo (sometimes also called the Kamper Park Zoo) is a small  zoo located within Kamper Park in Hattiesburg, Mississippi, United States.  The zoo is operated by the Hattiesburg Convention Commission.  As of 2019, the Commission's executive director was Rick Taylor.

History

The  for Kamper Park was donated to the Daughters of the Confederacy by John Kamper in 1902, and was given in turn to Hattiesburg in 1908 for a public park.

Exhibits

The zoo is located within Kamper Park among a grove of oak and pine trees, and is divided into several sections. Animal exhibits include amphibians, birds, invertebrates, mammals, and reptiles.

Africa 
The zoo's northmost area, the exhibit starts off with a mixed exhibit for African tortoises and porcupines and exhibits for breeds of cattle and fennec foxes, with a interpretive display with drums between them. The centrepiece is the African Veldt, for Grant's zebras, eland, and ostriches. Two other exhibits include servals and a mixed pen for DeBrazza guenon monkeys and Blue duikers.

Wallaby Walkabout 
In 2018, the zoo opened a barrier-free walk through, where visitors can interact with Bennett's wallabies, emus, and kunekune pigs.

Education

Asbury Discovery Center 
In 2014, the  Asbury Discovery Center opened to serve as a combined laboratory, classroom, and office space. The education center provides learning opportunities for children and adults.

The future

On January 5, 2018, Rick Taylor, the executive director of the Hattiesburg Convention Commission, asked the Hattiesburg City Council for $800,000 for a new exhibit at the zoo.

The zoo has since constructed new exhibits for giraffes and spotted hyenas, and is due to open in 2021.  Additional exhibits are for the zoo's alligators and flamingos.

References

External links

Zoos in Mississippi
Buildings and structures in Hattiesburg, Mississippi
Landmarks in Mississippi
Year of establishment missing
Tourist attractions in Forrest County, Mississippi